Nasri Atallah (born 12 November 1982) is a British-Lebanese author, award-winning producer, television host and media entrepreneur. He is the Editor-in-Chief of Esquire Middle East, one of the co-founders of Last Floor Productions, the founder of Dark Coast Media and a former contributing writer at GQ Middle East.

Biography 
Nasri Atallah was born and grew up in London, United Kingdom, where he attended the Lycée Français Charles de Gaulle. His parents, Samir Atallah and May Francis, are both British-Lebanese and were living in London at the time. His father, Samir Atallah, is a prominent Arab author, journalist and thinker, and the winner of many awards for his decades of contribution to Arab literature.

Atallah moved to Beirut for the first time in 1997, finished school and read politics at the American University of Beirut. He holds a Masters in International politics from the School of Oriental and African Studies, where he completed a dissertation on the Deterritorialization of Identity Through Transnational Media.

Career 
Atallah started is career at the United Nations Development Programme, then moved into energy research, later joining a wealth management firm before moving into advertising, content and production in 2009.

During a brief stint at J. Walter Thompson as a conceptual copywriter, Atallah wrote a blog entitled Our Man in Beirut which earned him notoriety amongst the Lebanese community both in Lebanon and abroad. His essays unpacking the difficulties of navigating Lebanese culture while having grown up abroad drew him both fans and detractors. The blog's success led to a publishing deal with Turning Point books, and the print version was released in December 2011 in Beirut, with book signings at Waterstones in London and at Livre Paris

From 2011 to 2017, Atallah worked at as Head of Media at a creative agency focused on culture from the Middle East, across music, publishing and film. There, he launched the career of the prominent Lebanese blues rock revival duo, The Wanton Bishops, through his role as their manager. He has also worked with Egyptian electro-singer and producer Bosaina, Montreal indie band Wake Island, and krautrock band Lumi.

Since 2018, he has been focused on creative projects in film and television as a producer and screenwriter, as well as continuing to write creative non-fiction and fiction. He is represented by Aoife Rice at United Agents.

Last Floor Productions 
In late 2019, he co-founded Last Floor Productions with two longtime friends, Mashrou' Leila band member and composer Firas Abou Fakher and writer and Lebanese Academy of Fine Arts screenwriting professor Daniel Habib. Last Floor Productions is focused on the creation of genre film & television, centered on telling stories about Arabs around the world. The company's first production, 10-episode psychological thriller Al Shak (Doubt), was written, shot and released entirely during the early phase of the coronavirus lockdown of 2020. It was produced as a Shahid Original for the leading streaming service launched by MBC Group. Later in 2020, Last Floor Productions released a second TV Series for Shahid, an 8-episode action comedy entitled Fixer. The company has also created short documentaries for Apple and the Victoria & Albert Museum.

GQ Middle East 
From 2018 to 2022, Atallah was a contributor for GQ Middle East. He has profiled leading Arab creatives like filmmaker Nadine Labaki, Moroccan rapper Issam, Syrian poet Adunis, Lebanese indie band Mashrou' Leila, pop star Ragheb Alama, actors Dali Benssalah, Bassel Khaiat & Ahmed Malek, Italian pop star Mahmood, artists Saint Hoax, Eli Rezkallah & Malak Mattar, and many more. He has also written essays, such as his account of the August 4th 2020 explosion in Beirut entitled "Inside Beirut's Broken Heart".

Esquire Middle East 
In August 2022, Atallah was appointed Editor-in-Chief of Esquire Middle East by ITP Media Group.

Other Work 
Atallah has also written for various publications, including The Guardian, GQ Magazine, Time Out, Brownbook, Little White Lies, Monocle and L'Orient-Le Jour.

He is also the co-host of the Bootleg Magic podcast with Alya Mooro and a regular guest on the BBC World Service's The Arts Hour with Nikki Bedi.

Filmography

Books 
 A Lost Summer: Postcards From Lebanon (Contributor) (Saqi Books, 2008) 
 Our Man in Beirut (Turning Point Books, 2011)  
 Share This Book (Contributor) (SHARE Foundation, 2013) 
 Beyrouth, Chroniques et détours by Mashallah News and AMI Collective (Foreword) (Tamyras Éditions, 2014) 
 Haramacy: A collection of essays prescribed by voices from the Middle East, South Asia and the diaspora (Contributor) (Unbound Books, 2022)

Personal life
Atallah is married to award-winning Lebanese fashion designer Nour Hage. The couple have been together since 2013.

References

External links 
 Nasri Atallah

1982 births
Living people
British people of Lebanese descent
British writers
American University of Beirut alumni
SOAS, University of London
Alumni of SOAS University of London
Lebanese writers
Lebanese filmmakers
British people of Arab descent
British television producers
British magazine editors